Brief Season (also known as As Long as it Lasts) is a 1969 Italian drama film written and directed by Renato Castellani.

Plot 
Johnny is a young American who lives in Rome, where he exercises the profession of stockbroker. Luisa is a Swedish girl who works as a simultaneous translator at the FAO. They meet on the occasion of a TV show, and fall in love.

Johnny, intending to secure a future for himself and Luisa, sells some securities in his care to attempt a stock market speculation based on some confidential information, but things do not go as expected.

Cast 

 Christopher Jones as Johnny	
 Pia Degermark as  Luisa	
 Antonello Trombadori as  Luisa's father	
 Angelo Boscariol		
 Valeria Sabel		
 Bianca Doria

References

External links

1969 films
Italian romantic drama films
1969 romantic drama films
Films directed by Renato Castellani
Films scored by Ennio Morricone
Films produced by Dino De Laurentiis
Trading films
1960s Italian films